John Bilbija is an Australian former professional rugby league footballer who played in the 1980s. He played for Western Suburbs, Balmain, Parramatta and South Sydney in the NSWRL competition.

Playing career
Bilbija made his first grade debut for Balmain in round 4 of the 1980 NSWRL season against Cronulla-Sutherland at Leichhardt Oval. The following season, he was limited to only one appearance as the club finished with the Wooden Spoon. In 1982, Bilbija signed for defending premiers Parramatta and made one appearance for the club in round 2 against his former side Balmain. In 1986, Bilbija joined Western Suburbs and made 40 appearances over two years however in his final season the club finished with the wooden spoon. In 1988, Bilbija signed for South Sydney and played four games for the club but was released at the end of the year.

References

1959 births
Western Suburbs Magpies players
South Sydney Rabbitohs players
Parramatta Eels players
Balmain Tigers players
Australian rugby league players
Rugby league second-rows
Living people